Ken McKenzie (1865–1917) was an Australian rules footballer for the Port Adelaide Football Club. He captained the club for eight years from 1890 to 1894 and 1896–1898. His two brothers, Alec and Jack also played for Port Adelaide.

Football 
Ken McKenzie had a successful career with the Port Adelaide Football Club. He won two SAFA premierships during his career, the Championship of Australian against South Melbourne in 1890, the club Best & Fairest in 1897 and was club captain for eight years.

The dispute was eventually resolved and he remained at Port Adelaide.

Second Boer War
Ken McKenzie served in the Second Boer War.

Later life

Pretoria 
Ken McKenzie spent the majority of his life after the Boer War in South Africa. He worked with the South African government.

Return to South Australia 
Shortly before his death he returned to South Australia.

References

Port Adelaide Football Club (SANFL) players
Port Adelaide Football Club players (all competitions)
1865 births
Year of death missing
Australian rules footballers from South Australia
Australian military personnel of the Second Boer War